Konstantin Treffner (13 October 1885 – 9 December 1978 Tallinn) was an Estonian educator and politician.

1919-1920 he was Minister of Education.

References

1885 births
1978 deaths
Estonian schoolteachers
Education ministers of Estonia
Estonian Social Democratic Workers' Party politicians
University of Tartu alumni
Hugo Treffner Gymnasium alumni
Recipients of the Order of the White Star, 3rd Class
People from Tõrva Parish
Burials at Pärnamäe Cemetery